The LAWASIA International Moot Competition ("LAWASIA Moot") is an annual international moot court competition that is organised by LAWASIA, an international organisation mainly comprising bar associations, lawyers, judges, and academics. The moot problem ranges from international human rights to international commercial arbitration, and the venue of the competition rotates between LAWASIA member states as it is usually held in conjunction with the annual LAWASIA Conference. Around 30 to 40 law schools from around the world take part in the moot each year; Malaysia is the only member state that conducts national rounds, of which the top two team teams — each university can send multiple teams — are selected for the international rounds. In the international rounds, teams would compete in up to ten rounds if they reach the championship final, which is usually judged by notable judges and practitioners.

The first edition of the moot was in 2005 and took place in Gold Coast, Australia. No moot took place in 2006 but the competition resumed in 2007 without any break in editions thereafter, before the 2019 riots in Hong Kong saw the withdrawal of many teams from the 14th edition. For the 2020 edition, while originally designated to be held in Mongolia, the international rounds were held online via Zoom due to travel restrictions brought about by Covid-19. The 2021 competition retained the online format due to continued travel restrictions.

Singapore Management University, which made its debut in 2009 and missed the 2010 and 2019 editions, has the best track record in this competition with five championships, four runners-up titles, four Best Oralist titles, and three Best Memorials titles. It also holds the record for the most number of final appearances (nine) and consecutive championship final appearances (five). Singapore, with six championships, is the winningest country; it is also the country with most championship final appearances (12).

Competition records

References

Moot court competitions
International law